Montgomery Lake may refer to the following lakes:

Montgomery Lake (Florence County, Wisconsin)
Montgomery Lake (Kenosha County, Wisconsin)
Montgomery Lake in Crawford County, Arkansas
Montgomery Lake in Faulkner County, Arkansas
Montgomery Lake, Pulaski County, Arkansas

See also
 Montgomery (disambiguation)